Hans Adolph Rademacher (3 April 1892, Wandsbeck, now Hamburg-Wandsbek – 7 February 1969, Haverford, Pennsylvania, USA) was a German-born American mathematician, known for work in mathematical analysis and number theory.

Biography
Rademacher received his Ph.D. in 1916 from Georg-August-Universität Göttingen; Constantin Carathéodory supervised his dissertation. In 1919, he became privatdozent under Constantin Carathéodory at University of Berlin. In 1922, he became an assistant professor at the University of Hamburg, where he supervised budding mathematicians like Theodor Estermann. He was dismissed from his position at the University of Breslau by the Nazis in 1933 due to his public support of the Weimar Republic, and emigrated from Europe in 1934.

After leaving Germany, he moved to Philadelphia and worked at the University of Pennsylvania until his retirement in 1962; he held the Thomas A. Scott Professorship of Mathematics at Pennsylvania from 1956 to 1962. Rademacher had a number of well-known students, including George Andrews, Paul T. Bateman, Theodor Estermann and Emil Grosswald.

Research
Rademacher performed research in analytic number theory, mathematical genetics, the theory of functions of a real variable, and quantum theory. Most notably, he developed the theory of Dedekind sums. In 1937 Rademacher discovered an exact convergent series for the partition function P(n), the number of integer partitions of a number, improving upon Ramanujan's asymptotic non-convergent series and validating Ramanujan's supposition that an exact series representation existed.

Awards and honors
With his retirement from the University of Pennsylvania, a group of mathematicians provided the seed funding for The Hans A. Rademacher Instructorships, and honored him with an honorary degree as Doctor of Science.

Rademacher is the co-author (with Otto Toeplitz) of the popular mathematics book The Enjoyment of Mathematics, published in German in 1930 and still in print.

Works 
 with Otto Toeplitz: Von Zahlen und Figuren. 1930. 2nd edn. 1933. Springer 2001, .
 The Enjoyment of Mathematics. Von Zahlen und Figuren translated into English by Herbert Zuckerman, Princeton University Press, 1957
 with Ernst Steinitz Vorlesungen über die Theorie der Polyeder- unter Einschluss der Elemente der Topologie. Springer 1932, 1976.
 Generalization of the Reciprocity Formula for Dedekind Sums. In: Duke Math. Journal. Vol. 21, 1954, pp. 391–397.
 Lectures on analytic number theory. 1955. 
 Lectures on elementary number theory. Blaisdell, New York 1964, Krieger 1977.
 with Grosswald: Dedekind sums. Carus Mathematical Monographs 1972.
 Topics in analytic number theory. ed. Grosswald. Springer Verlag, 1973 (Grundlehren der mathematischen Wissenschaften).
 Collected papers. 2 vols. ed. Grosswald. MIT press, 1974.
Higher mathematics from an elementary point of view. Birkhäuser 1983.

Further reading 
 George E. Andrews, David M. Bressoud, L. Alayne Parson (eds.) The Rademacher legacy to mathematics. American Mathematical Society, 1994.
 Lexikon bedeutender Mathematiker. Deutsch, Thun, Frankfurt am Main, .
 Tom Apostol: Introduction to Analytical number theory. Springer
 Tom Apostol: Modular functions and Dirichlet Series in Number Theory. Springer
  Obituary and list of publications.

See also
Hadamard transform
Rademacher's contour
Rademacher complexity
Rademacher function
Rademacher–Menchov theorem
Rademacher's series
Rademacher system
Rademacher distribution
Rademacher's theorem

References

External links

 

1892 births
1969 deaths
20th-century American mathematicians
Mathematics popularizers
German emigrants to the United States
20th-century German mathematicians
Number theorists
Mathematical analysts
University of Pennsylvania faculty
Mathematicians at the University of Pennsylvania
New York University faculty
University of Göttingen alumni
Academic staff of the University of Breslau
People from Wandsbek
People from Hamburg
Academic staff of the University of Hamburg
Academic staff of the Humboldt University of Berlin